In punctuation, a word divider is a form of glyph which separates written words. In languages which use the Latin, Cyrillic, and Arabic alphabets, as well as other scripts of Europe and West Asia, the word divider is a blank space, or whitespace. This convention is spreading, along with other aspects of European punctuation, to Asia and Africa, where words are usually written without word separation.

In computing, the word delimiter is used to refer to a character that separates two words. 

In character encoding, word segmentation depends on which characters are defined as word dividers.

History
In Ancient Egyptian, determinatives may have been used as much to demarcate word boundaries as to disambiguate the semantics of words. Rarely in Assyrian cuneiform, but commonly in the later cuneiform Ugaritic alphabet, a vertical stroke 𒑰 was used to separate words. In Old Persian cuneiform, a diagonally sloping wedge 𐏐 was used.

As the alphabet spread throughout the ancient world, words were often run together without division, and this practice remains or remained until recently in much of South and Southeast Asia. However, not infrequently in inscriptions a vertical line, and in manuscripts a single (·), double, or triple (⫶) interpunct (dot) was used to divide words. This practice was found in Phoenician, Aramaic, Hebrew, Greek, and Latin, and continues today with Ethiopic, though there whitespace is gaining ground.

Scriptio continua
The early alphabetic writing systems, such as the Phoenician alphabet, had only signs for consonants (although some signs for consonants could also stand for a vowel, so-called matres lectionis). Without some form of visible word dividers, parsing a text into its separate words would have been a puzzle. With the introduction of letters representing vowels in the Greek alphabet, the need for inter-word separation lessened. The earliest Greek inscriptions used interpuncts, as was common in the writing systems which preceded it, but soon the practice of scriptio continua, continuous writing in which all words ran together without separation became common.

Types

None
Alphabetic writing without inter-word separation, known as scriptio continua, was used in Ancient Egyptian. It appeared in Post-classical Latin after several centuries of the use of the interpunct.

Traditionally, scriptio continua was used for the Indic alphabets of South and Southeast Asia and hangul of Korea, but spacing is now used with hangul and increasingly with the Indic alphabets.

Today Chinese and Japanese are the most widely-used scripts consistently written without punctuation to separate words, though other scripts such as Thai and Lao also follow this writing convention. In Classical Chinese, a word and a character were almost the same thing, so that word dividers would have been superfluous. Although Modern Mandarin has numerous polysyllabic words, and each syllable is written with a distinct character, the conceptual link between character and word or at least morpheme remains strong, and no need is felt for word separation apart from what characters already provide. This link is also found in the Vietnamese language; however, in the Vietnamese alphabet, virtually all syllables are separated by spaces, whether or not they form word boundaries.

Space
Space is the most common word divider, especially in Latin script.

Vertical lines
Ancient inscribed and cuneiform scripts such as Anatolian hieroglyphs frequently used short vertical lines to separate words, as did Linear B. In manuscripts, vertical lines were more commonly used for larger breaks, equivalent to the Latin comma and period. This was the case for Biblical Hebrew (the paseq) and continues with many Indic scripts today (the danda).

Interpunct, multiple dots, and hypodiastole

As noted above, the single and double interpunct were used in manuscripts (on paper) throughout the ancient world. For example, Ethiopic inscriptions used a vertical line, whereas manuscripts used double dots (፡) resembling a colon. The latter practice continues today, though the space is making inroads. Classical Latin used the interpunct in both paper manuscripts and stone inscriptions. Ancient Greek orthography used between two and five dots as word separators, as well as the hypodiastole.

Different letter forms
In the modern Hebrew and Arabic alphabets, some letters have distinct forms at the ends and/or beginnings of words. This demarcation is used in addition to spacing.

Vertical arrangement

The Nastaʿlīq form of Islamic calligraphy uses vertical arrangement to separate words. The beginning of each word is written higher than the end of the preceding word, so that a line of text takes on a sawtooth appearance. Nastaliq spread from Persia and today is used for Persian, Uyghur, Pashto, and Urdu.

Pause
In finger spelling and in Morse code, words are separated by a pause.

Unicode
For use with computers, these marks have codepoints in Unicode:

See also
 Whitespace
 Sentence spacing
 Speech segmentation
 Zero-width non-joiner
 Zero-width space
 Substitute blank
 Underscore

References

Further reading
 
 
 
 
 

Punctuation